Fabrice Santoro and Nenad Zimonjić were the defending champions, but Santoro chose not to participate, and only Zimonjic competed that year.
Zimonjic partnered with Daniel Nestor, but lost in the quarterfinals to Sébastien Grosjean and Jo-Wilfried Tsonga.

Marat Safin and Dmitry Tursunov won in the final 6–4, 6–2, against Tomáš Cibulec and Lovro Zovko.

Seeds

Draw

Draw

External links
Draw

Kremlin Cup
Kremlin Cup